Andharangam is a 1975 Indian Tamil-language romantic drama film directed by Muktha Srinivasan. The film stars Kamal Haasan, Deepa, Major Sundarrajan and Savitri. It was taken primarily in black and white, but some song scenes were taken in Gevacolor. The song "Gnayiru Oli Mazhaiyil" marked Haasan's debut as a singer. The film was a not a hit. It was dubbed into Telugu-language as Andhala Raja and released on 29 October 1977.

Plot

Cast 
 Kamal Haasan as Kaanthan
 Major Sundarrajan as Thangadurai
 Savitri as Malliga
 Deepa as Deepa
 Thengai Srinivasan as "Coimbatore" Godhandam
 Cho Ramaswamy as "Thanjavur" Dhandapani
 Manorama as Chellamma
 V. Gopalakrishnan
 Kathadi Ramamurthy
LIC Narasimhan as Liquor seller
K. K. Sounder as Police constable
 Sukumari as "Madurai" Maragatham
 Kumari Padmini as Kanaka
 Tambaram Lalitha

Production 
Andharangam was directed by Muktha Srinivasan, written by A. S. Pragasam. It was Deepa a.k.a. Unni Mary's acting debut in Tamil cinema. The film was taken primarily in black and white, but the song scenes of "Gnayiru Oli Mazhaiyil", "Paadaganai Thedikondu" and "Pudhu Mugame" were taken in Gevacolor.

Soundtrack 
The music was composed by G. Devarajan, while the lyrics were written by Kannadasan, Vaali and Nethaji. The song "Gnaayiru Oli Mazhaiyil" marked Kamal Haasan's debut as a singer.

Reception 
Andharangam was released on 12 December 1975. Kanthan of Kalki said there was no redeemable aspect of the film.

References

External links 

1970s Tamil-language films
1975 films
1975 romantic drama films
Films directed by Muktha Srinivasan
Films scored by G. Devarajan
Indian romantic drama films